List of Mountains in South Africa, Lesotho and Eswatini is a general list of mountains in South Africa, Lesotho and Eswatini with elevation. This list includes mountains in two other sovereign states, in the Stormberg-Drakensberg range, where the highest elevations are to be found in Lesotho, as well as Emlembe, the highest mountain in Eswatini, located at the border with South Africa.

Several of the highest peaks have snow in the Southern hemisphere winter season.

A Khulu is a peak above  and not within  of another Khulu, as defined by the Mountain Club of South Africa. Seweweekspoortpiek and Du Toits Peak are among the ultra prominent peaks of Africa.

A few mountains, such as Spion Kop or Isandlwana are historically important hills, even though they are relatively not very high. Table Mountain is important because of its emblematic flatness.

List

See also 
Geography of South Africa
List of Ultras of Africa
List of mountain ranges of South Africa
Highest mountain peaks of Africa

References

External links
South Africa - Highest Mountains
Highest summits in southern Africa

 

Mountains
Mountains
South Africa
South Africa